Kokhma is a town in Ivanovo Oblast, Russia, located on the Uvod River (Klyazma's tributary)  southeast of Ivanovo. Population:

History
It was first mentioned in 1619 as the village of Rozhdestvenskoye-Kokhma. Town status was granted to it in 1925.

Administrative and municipal status
Within the framework of administrative divisions, it is incorporated as the Town of Kokhma—an administrative unit with the status equal to that of the districts. As a municipal division, the Town of Kokhma is incorporated as Kokhma Urban Okrug.

Economy
Cotton mill
Flax-spinning and weaving mill
Strommashina machine-building factory

References

External links
Official website of Kokhma 
Mojgorod.ru. Entry on Kokhma 

Cities and towns in Ivanovo Oblast
Shuysky Uyezd